Pultenaea maritima, commonly known as coastal bush-pea or coastal headland pea, is a species of flowering plant in the family Fabaceae and is endemic to eastern Australia. It is a prostrate, mat-forming shrub with elliptic, or oblong to spatula-shaped leaves and pea-like flowers.

Description
Pultenaea maritima is a prostrate, mat-forming shrub with softly-hairy stems.

Taxonomy and naming
Pultenaea maritima was first formally described in 2002 by Rogier Petrus Johannes de Kok in Australian Systematic Botany from specimens collected in Woolgoolga in 1982. The specific epithet (maritima) means "growing by the sea".

Distribution and habitat
Coastal bush-pea grows in grassland, shrubland and heath on exposed coastal headland from south-eastern Queensland to Newcastle in New South Wales.

Conservation status
This pultenaea is classified as "vulnerable" under the New South Wales Government Biodiversity Conservation Act 2016.

References

maritima
Flora of New South Wales
Flora of Queensland
Plants described in 2002